Råbelöv Castle is a manor house in Kristianstad Municipality in Scania,  Sweden.

History
The estate was named after the village Råby, where rå stands for a troll, and by stands for a village; löv is an ornamental addition meaning a leaf. Danish councilor and war commissioner in Scania   Christoffer Ulfeldt  (1583–1653) had the main building built in 1637. The estate passed to his son Ebbe Christoffersen Ulfeldt (1616–1682) in 1663. After Ulfeldt's death in 1682, Råbelöv passed to his brother-in-law, Swedish military officer Carl Gustaf Skytte  (1647–1717).  In 1782, the estate burned down and the main building was severely damaged. Completely new buildings were subsequently built.

See also
List of castles in Sweden

References

External links
Råbelöf website

 Buildings and structures in Skåne County